In media, a spin-off (or spinoff) is a radio program, television program, film, video game or any narrative work, derived from already existing works that focus on more details and different aspects from the original work (e.g. particular topics, characters or events).

One of the earliest spin-offs of the modern media era, if not the first, happened in 1941 when the supporting character Throckmorton P. Gildersleeve from the old time radio comedy show Fibber McGee and Molly became the star of his own program The Great Gildersleeve (1941–1957).

In genre fiction, the term parallels its usage in television; it is usually meant to indicate a substantial change in narrative viewpoint and activity from that (previous) storyline based on the activities of the series' principal protagonist and so is a shift to that action and overall narrative thread of some other protagonist, which now becomes the central or main thread (storyline) of the new subseries. The new protagonist generally appears first as a minor or supporting character in the main story line within a given milieu and it is very common for the previous protagonist to have a supporting or cameo role, at the least as a historical mention, in the new subseries. Spin-offs sometimes generate their own spin-offs, leaving the new show in its own series only vaguely connected to the original series - for example the police procedural franchises of NCIS/JAG and CSI have both spun off multiple shows, including multiple spin-offs from series and spin-offs from spin-offs.

Sidequels 
A spin-off may be called a sidequel, a portmanteau of "side" (as in side-by-side) and "sequel", when it occurs in the same time-frame as the original, sometimes contacting with the main narrative at points. In Japanese, the word  also refers to such contemporaneous spin-offs and is frequently translated as "side story".

Crossovers

Sometimes even where a show is not a spin-off from another, there will nevertheless be crossovers, where a character from one show makes an appearance on another. Sometimes crossovers are created in an attempt to provide closure to fans of another failed series. Sometimes show producers will re-introduce a character from an older series into a later one as a way of providing a connectivity of that particular producer's television "world".

See also
 Canon (fiction)
 Digression
 Expanded universe
 List of media spin-offs
 List of television spin-offs
 Parallel novel
Robin Hood in popular culture
 Spiritual successor
 Standalone film

References

 
Television terminology
Film and video terminology